Gaios is the main port on Paxos, the smallest of the seven principal Ionian Islands, in Greece. Gaios is situated on the east coast of the island. It is named after a homonymous pupil of Paul the Apostle, who brought Christianity to the island.

References

External links
Paxoi 

Mediterranean port cities and towns in Greece
Populated places in Corfu (regional unit)